The Catalina Catamaran is an American catamaran sailboat that was designed by W. D. Schock Corp's in-house designer, Seymour Paul, as a racer and day sailer, It was first built in 1960.

Production
The design was built by W. D. Schock Corp in the United States, from 1960 until 1964, with a total of 54 boats completed, but it is now out of production.

Design
The Catalina Catamaran is a recreational sailing dinghy, with the hulls built predominantly of fiberglass. It has a fractional sloop  rig. The hulls have raked stems, plumb transoms, with twin transom-hung rudders controlled by a single tiller. Each hull has a retractable centerboard. The boat displaces .

For sailing downwind the design may be equipped with a symmetrical spinnaker.

See also
List of sailing boat types

Similar sailboats
Hobie 17

References

Catamarans
Dinghies
1960s sailboat type designs
Sailing yachts
Sailboat type designs by Seymour Paul
Sailboat types built by W. D. Schock Corp